Roberto Gándara González (born 16 April 1990) is a Spanish professional footballer who plays for Palencia CF as a midfielder.

Club career
Born in Salamanca, Gándara graduated from the youth academy of local UD Salamanca and made his debut for the reserves in 2009–10 season, in Tercera División. After a stint with Arenas Club de Getxo in the same tier (securing promotion to Segunda División B), he signed for CD Badajoz on a one-year contract on 18 July 2015.

On 16 July 2016, Gándara switched to CF Talavera de la Reina. At the end of the 2016–17 season, the club won promotion to Segunda División B. On 30 June 2018, he moved abroad for the first time in his career and joined Polish I liga club Podbeskidzie Bielsko-Biała.

References

External links

1990 births
Living people
Sportspeople from Salamanca
Association football midfielders
Spanish footballers
Segunda División B players
Tercera División players
I liga players
Arenas Club de Getxo footballers
CD Badajoz players
CF Talavera de la Reina players
Club Portugalete players
CF Palencia footballers
Podbeskidzie Bielsko-Biała players
Spanish expatriate footballers
Expatriate footballers in Poland
Spanish expatriate sportspeople in Poland